is a former Japanese football player.

Club statistics
Updated to 30 December 2018.

References

External links

Profile at Zweigen Kanazawa

1990 births
Living people
Hokuriku University alumni
Association football people from Aichi Prefecture
Japanese footballers
J2 League players
J3 League players
Japan Football League players
Zweigen Kanazawa players
Azul Claro Numazu players
Association football midfielders